David Keller Leighton, Sr. (January 22, 1922 – August 7, 2013) was the American bishop of the Episcopal Diocese of Maryland 1972–1985.

Early life and education
Leighton was born in Pittsburgh, Pennsylvania on January 22, 1922, the son of Frank Kingsley Leighton and Irene Adele Keller. He served in the United States Army Air Forces during World War II. On January 18, 1945, he married Carolyn Ruth Smith and together had three children. In 1947, Leighton graduated from Northwestern University and worked for General Motors. He then went to Virginia Theological Seminary and was ordained a priest in 1955. In 1969 he was awarded a Doctor of Divinity from Virginia Theological Seminary.

Ordained Ministry
After ordination in 1955, he became curate of Calvary Church in Pittsburgh, Pennsylvania and in 1956 he became rector of St Andrew's Church in Pittsburgh, Pennsylvania. Between 1959 and 1963, he served as rector of the Church of the Holy Nativity in Forest Park, Baltimore. He subsequently was a teacher of sacred studies at the St. Paul's School (Brooklandville, Maryland). Later, he became Archdeacon of Maryland, a post he retained till 1968.

Episcopacy
In 1968, he was elected coadjutor bishop of the Diocese of Maryland and was consecrated on November 30, 1968, at Emmanuel Church, 
in Baltimore, by Presiding Bishop John E. Hines. He succeeded as diocesan bishop in January 1972. He was the first Bishop of Maryland to ordain the first woman to the priesthood in the Diocese of Maryland in 1977. Leighton retired in 1985. He died in Sykesville, Maryland.

Notes

External links
The Culture is Changing by D. K. Leighton, Sr.

1922 births
2013 deaths
Religious leaders from Pittsburgh
United States Army Air Forces soldiers
Northwestern University alumni
Virginia Theological Seminary alumni
Episcopal bishops of Maryland
United States Army personnel of World War II
Military personnel from Pittsburgh
20th-century American Episcopalians